A list of films produced in the United Kingdom in 1943:

1943

See also
 1943 in British music
 1943 in British television
 1943 in the United Kingdom

References

External links
 

1943
Films
British
1940s in British cinema